Bielikowo  (German Behlkow) is a village in the administrative district of Gmina Brojce, within Gryfice County, West Pomeranian Voivodeship, in north-western Poland.

Before 1637 the area was part of Duchy of Pomerania. For the history of the region, see History of Pomerania.

The village has a population of 252.

References

Bielikowo